Pattison Lake is a lake in the U.S. state of Washington. The lake was named after James Pattison, a pioneer settler.

See also
 List of lakes in Washington

References

Lakes of Washington (state)
Lakes of Thurston County, Washington